Maglenik Heights (‘Maglenishki Vazvisheniya’ \'m&-gle-nish-ki v&-zvi-'she-ni-ya\) are the heights rising to 2752 m at Mount Gozur and including also Roberts Peak, Chapman Peak, Ichera Peak, Voysil Peak, Zimornitsa Peak and Mirovyane Peak in north-central Sentinel Range in Ellsworth Mountains, Antarctica, extending 26 km in north–south direction and 20 km in east–west direction. They are bounded by Ellen Glacier to the south and west, Embree Glacier and Kopsis Glacier to the north, and Rutford Ice Stream and Arapya Glacier to the east, and linked to Bangey Heights to the northwest by Panicheri Gap, and to Barnes Ridge to the east by Dropla Gap.

The heights are named after Maglenik Ridge in Southern Bulgaria.

Location
US mapping in 1961, updated in 1988.

Maps
 Vinson Massif.  Scale 1:250 000 topographic map.  Reston, Virginia: US Geological Survey, 1988.
 Antarctic Digital Database (ADD). Scale 1:250000 topographic map of Antarctica. Scientific Committee on Antarctic Research (SCAR). Since 1993, regularly updated.

See also
 Mountains in Antarctica

Geographical features include:

 Arapya Glacier
 Barnes Ridge
 Chapman Peak
 Dropla Gap
 Ellen Glacier
 Embree Glacier
 Ichera Peak
 Kopsis Glacier
 Mirovyane Peak
 Mount Gozur
 Panicheri Gap
 Roberts Peak
 Voysil Peak
 Young Glacier
 Zimornitsa Peak
 Rutford Ice Stream

Notes

References
 Maglenik Heights. SCAR Composite Antarctic Gazetteer.
 Bulgarian Antarctic Gazetteer. Antarctic Place-names Commission. (details in Bulgarian, basic data in English)

External links
 Maglenik Heights. Copernix satellite image

Mountains of Ellsworth Land
Bulgaria and the Antarctic